Dobroselica is a village in the municipality of Rekovac, Serbia. According to the 2002 census, the village has a population of 36 people.

References

External links 
 Levač Online
 Article about Dobroselica
 Pictures

Populated places in Pomoravlje District